Ala al-Din Siddiq Kujuji was a Persian bureaucrat from the Kujuji family, who served as a vizier to the Qara Qoyunlu leader Jahan Shah from  to 1455/6. Siddiq later played a key role in the succession struggle that ensured after Jahan Shah's death.

References

Sources 
 

15th-century Iranian people
Government officials of the Kara Koyunlu
Year of birth unknown
Year of death unknown
Politicians from Tabriz
Kujuji family